Nicolae Timofti (born 22 December 1948) is a Moldovan jurist and politician who was President of Moldova from 23 March 2012 until 23 December 2016. He served as head of Moldova's Supreme Magistrate Council and was elected President by parliament on 16 March 2012.

Early life and education
Timofti was born to Elena (born 1927) and Vasile Timofti in Ciutulești, Moldavian SSR, Soviet Union, and has four siblings. At the beginning of 1949, his family moved to Florești. On 6 July 1949, his paternal grandfather Tudor Timofti was deported by Soviet authorities to the Amur region, where he died in 1953. Timofti graduated from the law school of Moldova State University in 1972.

Early activity
After graduation, Timofti spent two years in the Soviet Army before beginning his career as a judge in 1976. "He is a person who was with us when we started reforms in the 1990s," Mihai Ghimpu said. In 2005, Timofti was appointed to the Higher Judicial Chamber and, in 2011, he was named chairman of the Supreme Council of Magistrates.

President of Moldova

After his election by parliament, Timofti identified Moldova's European orientation as a priority, as it had been the country's policy during the previous years; he stated that this policy "must continue" and that his country "has no other future than a European future". Former acting president and speaker of the Parliament of Moldova Mihai Ghimpu called Timofti "...a progressive man, [which] means a lot for the Republic of Moldova."

Personal life
Timofti is married to the lawyer Margareta Timofti and they have three sons: Alexei (born 1977) works as a lawyer for the World Bank in Washington, Nicolae (Nicu) (born 1980) is a sports journalist in Chișinău, and Ștefan (born 1989) studies economics in Chișinău.

Awards 

 Order of Work Glory
 Honorary Title "Om emerit" 
 Order of the Republic of Serbia (Serbia, 2013)
 Order of the Star of Romania (Romania, 2016)
 Order of Stara Planina (Bulgaria, 2016)

References

External links
 
 Official Youtube channel of Nicolae Timofti
 Profile: Who Is Moldova's New President-Elect? 
 News in Moldova about Nicolae Timofti 
 Timofti's inauguration in 2012
 Timofti with Giorgi Margvelashvili in 2014
 Timofti with Patriarch Kirill of Moscow in 2013

1948 births
Living people
Moldova State University alumni
Moldovan jurists
People from Florești District
Presidents of Moldova
Romanian people of Moldovan descent
Recipients of the Order of the Star of Romania